Nationality words link to articles with information on the nation's poetry or literature (for instance, Irish or France).

Events
 January 29 – Greenock Burns Club holds the first Burns dinner, in Alloway, in honour of Scottish poet Robert Burns (died 1796).
 April 15 – William Wordsworth and his sister Dorothy, walking by Ullswater near their home in the Lake District of England, come across a "long belt" of daffodils, a circumstance which inspires his poem "I Wandered Lonely as a Cloud", written in 1804, first published in 1807 and in revised form in 1815. It is titled "The Daffodils" in some anthologies.
 May 3–9 – Having recollected in tranquility while walking on Barton Fell near Ullswater an experience of despondency, William Wordsworth writes "The Leech-Gatherer", the first draft of his poem "Resolution and Independence" (published in 1807).
 Summer – Adam Oehlenschläger writes at a sitting the poem "Guldhornene", introducing Romanticism into Danish poetry.
 July 31 – William Wordsworth, leaving London for Dover and Calais with Dorothy, witnesses the early morning scene which he captures in his Petrarchan sonnet "Composed upon Westminster Bridge". In Calais, he will meet his 9-year-old illegitimate daughter Caroline for the first time.
 October 4 – Wordsworth marries Mary Hutchinson at Brompton, Scarborough.
 Henry Boyd completes the first full English translation of Dante's Divine Comedy.

Poetry published

United Kingdom
 Anne Bannerman, Tales of Superstition and Chivalry, Scottish Gothic ballad collection
 Robert Bloomfield, Rural Tales, Ballads and Songs
 Sir Alexander Boswell, Songs, Chiefly in the Scottish Dialect
 Samuel Taylor Coleridge, Dejection: An Ode, first published October 4, 1802, in the Morning Post (see also Wordsworth and Coleridge, Lyrical Ballads, below, in which the poem is again published this year)
 George Dyer, Poems
 William Gifford, The Satires of Decimus Junius Juvenalis
 Joseph Ritson, Ancient English Metrical Romances
 Walter Savage Landor, Poetry by the author of Gebir
 Amelia Opie, Poems
 Tadhg Gaelach Ó Súilleabháin (died 1795), Timothy O'Sullivan's Pious Miscellany, Irish Gaelic language poet published in Ireland
 Walter Scott, editor, Minstrelsy of the Scottish Border (1802–03), an anthology of ballads
 William Wordsworth and Samuel Taylor Coleridge, new edition of Lyrical Ballads, with Pastoral and Other Poems, published under Wordsworth's name but with poems by Coleridge as well; Preface of 1801 expanded and texts of numerous poems amended; includes Coleridge's "Dejection: An Ode" (Later, revised editions: 1798, 1801, 1805)

Other
 John Blair Linn, The Powers of Genius, A Poem, in Three Parts, By John Blair Linn ... Second Edition, Corrected and Enlarged, Philadelphia: John Conrad, & Co.; sold by M. and J. Conrad & Co., United States
 Charles Morris, Songs Political and Convivial, United States

Births
Death years link to the corresponding "[year] in poetry" article:
 February 11 – Lydia Maria Child (died 1880), American abolitionist, women's rights activist, Indian rights activist, novelist, journalist and poet; author of "Over the River and Through the Woods"
 February 26 – Victor Hugo (died 1885), French novelist, playwright and poet
 March 14 – Rangga Warsita (died 1873), Javanese
 July 28 – Winthrop Mackworth Praed (died 1839) English politician and poet
 August 14 – Letitia Elizabeth Landon, also known as "L.E.L." (died 1838), English poet and novelist
 August 28 – Thomas Aird (died 1876), Scottish
 October 1 – Edward Coote Pinkney (died 1828), American poet, lawyer, sailor, professor, and editor
 October 10 – George Pope Morris (died 1864), American editor, poet, and songwriter
 December 23 – Sara Coleridge (died 1852), English poet and translator; daughter of Samuel Taylor Coleridge
 December 31 – Richard Henry Horne (died 1884), English poet, critic and journalist, and public official in Australia
 date not known – Isaac Williams (died 1865) English poet and tractarian, a prominent member of the Oxford Movement

Deaths
Birth years link to the corresponding "[year] in poetry" article:
 April 18 – Erasmus Darwin (born 1731), English physician, natural philosopher, physiologist, inventor and poet (grandfather of Charles Darwin)
 September 17 – Richard Owen Cambridge (born 1717), English
 Also:
 Sophia Burrell (born 1750), English poet and playwright
 Christoph Friedrich Sangerhausen (born 1740), German

See also

 List of years in poetry
 List of years in literature
 19th century in literature
 19th century in poetry
 Romantic poetry
 Golden Age of Russian Poetry (1800–1850)
 Weimar Classicism period in Germany, commonly considered to have begun in 1788  and to have ended either in 1805, with the death of Friedrich Schiller, or 1832, with the death of Goethe
 List of poets
 Poetry

Notes

 "A Timeline of English Poetry" Web page of the Representative Poetry Online Web site, University of Toronto

19th-century poetry

Poetry